The Berowra Valley National Park is a protected national park that is located in northern Sydney, New South Wales, Australia. Located within the Sydney Basin, the park is part of the dissected Hornsby Plateau which is dominated by Hawkesbury Sandstone and predominantly covers the catchment area of Berowra Creek.

A contiguous stretch of parkland, from south to north, its southern boundary is defined by Boundary Road, Pennant Hills; its southeastern boundary defined by the western limits of Hornsby; its northeastern boundary defined by the Pacific Motorway; its northern boundary defined by Berowra Waters; and its western boundary defined by a series of creek and gullies as the park extends into Galston Gorge and further south.

A  stretch of the Great North Walk is located within the national park.

Etymology
In the local indigenous language the word Berowra means a "place of many winds".

History

Additional lands were acquired and the park was gazetted as Reserve No. 100092 for public recreation and the study and preservation of native flora and fauna in 1987. This gazettal was in response to increasing community concern over the development of bushland areas in the Hornsby Shire. The park then came to be known as Berowra Valley Bushland Park. Further land additions were made to the park, which was gazetted as Berowra Valley Regional Park on 27 March 1998, and was gazetted as a national park in September 2012.

On 27 January 2013 a man was found alive in the park after spending 9 weeks being lost. He survived one of Australia's worst heatwaves during which daytime temperatures reached more than 45 degrees, surviving on water and food he had brought with him.

See also

 Protected areas of New South Wales
Geography of Sydney

References

External links
 
 
 
 
 

National parks of New South Wales
Protected areas established in 2012
2012 establishments in Australia
Urban forests
Parks in Sydney
Valleys of Australia
Hornsby Shire